Verdi is a personal name. It may be either surname or a given name. Notable people with the name include:

Surname 
Chad A. Verdi, American film producer
Clenet Verdi-Rose (born 1982), American film director, producer, and screenwriter
Ellis Verdi (born 1955), American marketing and advertising executive
Frank Verdi (born 1926), American baseball player
Giuseppe Verdi (1813–1901), Italian composer
Gregorio Verdi (20th century), Argentine actor
José Verdi (volleyball), b. 1990
Leonard Verdi Goldsworthy (1909–1994), Australian bomb and mine specialist
Paride Suzzara Verdi (1826–1879),  Italian journalist and politician
Robert Verdi (born 1968), American television personality
Roger Verdi (born 1953), English retired professional footballer
Simone Verdi (born 1992), Italian footballer
Tory Verdi, American women's basketball coach

Given name 
Verdi Godwin (1926–2013), English footballer
Verdi Boyer (1911–2003),  American football player

See also
Allah Verdi (disambiguation)
Shah Verdi (disambiguation)